The 1977 NCAA Division I Golf Championship was the 39th annual NCAA-sanctioned golf tournament to determine the individual and team national champions of men's collegiate golf at the University Division level in the United States.

The tournament was held at the Seven Oaks Golf Course in Hamilton, New York.

Houston won the team championship, the Cougars' twelfth NCAA title.

Defending NCAA champion and future U.S. Open champion Scott Simpson, USC, won the individual title, his second.

Individual results

Individual champion
 Scott Simpson, USC

Team results

DC = Defending champions
Debut appearance

References

NCAA Men's Golf Championship
Golf in New York (state)
NCAA Golf Championship
NCAA Golf Championship
NCAA Golf Championship